Chantry Island may refer to:

Chantry Island, Hertfordshire,  a small piece of land in Hertfordshire, United Kingdom
Canada
Chantry Island Lightstation Tower, a small island on Lake Huron containing the Chantry Island Lighthouse and Bird Sanctuary.
Chantry Island (Ontario), a small island in Lake Huron
Chantry Island (Nunavut), a small island in Dolphin and Union Strait, near Victoria Island